Alagie Sosseh (born 21 July 1986) is a Gambian football player who plays for Vietnamese club Sông Lam Nghệ An

Career
Sosseh has played for Hammarby IF and Landskrona BoIS. In December 2015, Sosseh transferred to Siah Jamegan of the Persian Gulf Pro League.

International career
As of 31 March 2011, he has played seven internationals for the Gambian national football team.

Personal life
Sosseh is the brother of the professional footballer Sal Jobarteh.

References

External links
 
 
 Alagie Sosseh at SvFF (in Swedish)

Living people
1986 births
Swedish people of Gambian descent
People with acquired Gambian citizenship
Gambian footballers
Expatriate footballers in Iran
Swedish footballers
Swedish expatriate footballers
The Gambia international footballers
Association football forwards
Association football defenders
Landskrona BoIS players
Hammarby Talang FF players
Hammarby Fotboll players
AFC Eskilstuna players
IK Sirius Fotboll players
Mjøndalen IF players
Nest-Sotra Fotball players
IK Frej players
Akropolis IF players
Assyriska FF players
Enskede IK players
Song Lam Nghe An FC players
Allsvenskan players
Superettan players
Norwegian First Division players
Eliteserien players
Persian Gulf Pro League players
Expatriate footballers in Norway
Expatriate footballers in Turkey
Expatriate footballers in Vietnam
Gambian expatriate sportspeople in Norway
Gambian expatriate sportspeople in Turkey
Footballers from Stockholm